Beuren may refer to:

Beuren, Esslingen, a municipality in the district of Esslingen, Baden-Württemberg, Germany
Beuren, Cochem-Zell, a municipality in the district Cochem-Zell, Rhineland-Palatinate, Germany
Beuren, Trier-Saarburg, a municipality in the district Trier-Saarburg, Rhineland-Palatinate, Germany

See also

 
 
 Van Beuren (surname)